Daniel Koffi-Konan (born August 1, 1981 in Bouaké) is an Ivorian professional football player. Currently, he plays in the Championnat de France amateur for FC Martigues. He also holds French citizenship.

He played on the professional level in Ligue 2 for FC Martigues.

External links
 

1981 births
Living people
Ivorian footballers
Ligue 2 players
FC Martigues players
AC Arlésien players
Pau FC players
UA Cognac players
AS Gardanne players
People from Bouaké
Association football forwards